Enrico Mariani was an Italian rower who won a gold, a silver and a bronze medal at the European championships of 1931–1932.

References

Italian male rowers
European Rowing Championships medalists